Al Shahaniya Sports Club, is a Qatari sports club based in Al-Shahaniya, a town 20 km from the capital Doha. Founded in 1998, the most prominent team of the club is the football team which plays in the Qatari Second Division. The club's home ground is Grand Hamad Stadium.

History
Al Shahaniya was founded on 27 December 1998, under the name Al-Nasr, under the decision of Sheikh Mohammed Bin Eid Al Thani, who was then the chairman of the Public Authority for youth and sports at that time. At the beginning of its establishment, the club's headquarters were located in Al Jemailiya. In 2001, the club relocated to Al-Shahaniya, which is approximately 20 km northwest of Doha, under the decision of Sheikh Jassim bin Thamer al Thani, who was vice president of the Qatar Olympic Committee at that time.

In 2004, the club changed its name to Al Shahaniya by decision of the board of directors, in order to better represent the region where it is based.

Management
Updated 9 June 2020.

Current squad
As of Qatari Second Division:

Personnel

Current technical staff
Last update: 31 October 2020.

Presidential history
Updated June 2014.
1.  Misfer bin Faisal Al Shahwani (1996–04)
2.  Fayez Menahi Al Hajri (2004–07)
3.  Misfer bin Faisal Al Shahwani (2007–08)
4.  Menahi Al Shammari (2008–present)

Managerial history

 Stefano Impagliazzo (2002)
 Danny Hoekman (Dec 2003–March 2004)
 Fareed Ramzi (2004)
 Saad Hafez (2004–2006)
 Said Riziki (2006–2007)
 Stéphane Morello (2007–2008)
 Luizinho (2009)
 Hisham Ali (2009)
 Mohammad Sibai (2009–Feb 2012)
 Luizinho (Feb 2012–Nov 2012)
 Ion Ion (Nov 2012–Feb 2013)
 Yousuf Adam (Feb 2013–May 2013)
 Milton Mendes (May 2013–Sept 2013)
 Zé Nando (Sept 2013–Jan 2014)
 Alexandre Gama (Jan 2014–May 2014)
 Luís Martins (May 2014–July 2014)
 Miguel Ángel Lotina (July 2014–Sept 2014)
 Zé Nando (Sept 2014 – Nov 2014)
 Luka Bonačić (Nov 2014–Jan 2016)
 Igor Štimac (Jan 2016–Nov 2017)
 José Murcia (Nov 2017–Jun 2020)
 Nabil Anwar (Jun 2020–present)

Notes

External links
 Official website

Shahania Sports Club
1998 establishments in Qatar
Sport in Al-Shahaniya